Dr. Lale Akgün (born 17 September 1953 in Istanbul, Turkey) is a German politician and member of the SPD. She served as an MP for Cologne II electoral district in the German Bundestag from 2002 to 2009.

Life 
Lale Akgün's Turkish family moved to Germany when she was 9. She studied psychology and medicine at Marburg, where she attained a doctorate in the former. Akgün then served in the Cologne city administration in juvenile welfare services/family consultation as the deputy agency chief. Since 1997, she has headed the LzA in North Rhine-Westphalia based in Solingen. Akgün is married with one daughter.

External links
Personal website
Lale Akgün Bundestag profile

1953 births
Living people
Turkish emigrants to Germany
Members of the Bundestag for North Rhine-Westphalia
Politicians from Istanbul
Female members of the Bundestag
German politicians of Turkish descent
21st-century German women politicians
Recipients of the Cross of the Order of Merit of the Federal Republic of Germany
Members of the Bundestag 2005–2009
Members of the Bundestag 2002–2005
Members of the Bundestag for the Social Democratic Party of Germany